Manuel García Gargallo (Barcelona, 24 June 1973) is a Spanish researcher and writer, specialized in history of sport. He graduated in History at University of Barcelona (UB). His books have focused on sport in Balearic Islands, especially football and cycling, as well as classical music. He fought for preservation of sports cultural heritage by preservation of Velodrome of Tirador and recovery with neighboring Canódromo Balear (older Greyhound racing) as future Urban Forest of the city. He collaborates in regional press, writing about these topics and others like history or actuality.

Works 
 Els origens de l'Atlètic Balears (1920-1942). Dels inicis a la fusió. Barcelona: Lulú, 2013 

 100 anys del Club Deportiu Consell. 1918-2018. Palma: Graficmon, 2017  In collaboration with Miguel Vidal Perelló

 El velòdrom de Tirador. Una història de l'esport a Mallorca. Palma: Illa Edicions, 2018 

 Campeonatos Regionales de Baleares. Orígenes y desarrollo (1900-1940). Madrid: CIHEFE, 2019 

 L’Atlètic Balears (1920-1942): Els primers anys d’una entitat centenària. Palma: Documenta Balear, 2020 

 El Canòdrom Balear. Una historia del llebrer a Palma. Palma: Documenta Balear, 2021 

 El mundo sonoro del siglo XX. 101 obras clásicas para un siglo. Palma: Documenta Balear, 2022

References

External links 
 Publications on Dialnet (bibliographic database)

1973 births
Writers from Barcelona
Historians from Catalonia
Living people
Mensans
Sports historians
21st-century Spanish historians